David E. Kaplan (born 1955) is an investigative reporter and former director of the Center for Public Integrity's International Consortium of Investigative Journalists. Before this post, he worked for the American newsweekly U.S. News & World Report.

Works
David E. Kaplan commonly writes about terrorism, organized crime, and intelligence. He is co-author of Yakuza (University of California Press, 2003).

Kaplan is also co-author of The Cult at the End of the World, on the Aum doomsday sect behind the 1995 nerve gassing of Tokyo's subway (Crown, 1996); and author of Fires of the Dragon, on the life and murder of Taiwanese-American journalist Henry Liu.

Books
 Cult at the End of the World: The Terrifying Story of the Aum Doomsday Cult, from the Subways of Tokyo to the Nuclear Arsenals of Russia. New York: Crown Publishers (1996). .
 Yakuza: Japan's Criminal Underworld, Expanded Edition, with Alec Debro. Berkeley: University of California Press (2003). .

References

External links

American male journalists
Living people
1955 births
20th-century American journalists
Place of birth missing (living people)